Jozef Dunajovec (23 March 1933 – 22 February 2007) was a Slovak journalist, essayist and non-fiction author.

Biography 
Dunajovec, born in 1933, graduated from the "High Agriculture School and Economic University" in Bratislava. During his studies he joined the editorial team of the daily Smena, and later he worked for Rolnické noviny, Hospodárske noviny, Nové slovo, Mladé rozlety, and Predvoj. He finished his journalist career as a Managing Editor of 
Krásy Slovenska.

Works 
Besides a range of editorials, articles, essays and reportages, he wrote 
eighteen books. His most well-known works are:
 1966 - The Exhorting Backwaters (Mŕtve ramená volajú)
 1974 - The Human Footmarks (Po ľuďoch stopy), Through The Back Roads (Poľnými cestami)
 1976 - The River People (Riečni ľudia) in Hungarian Ember és folyó (1977)
 1980 - The Bread (Chlieb)
 1995 - A Dramatic Event on the 1801st Kilometer (Dráma na kilometri 1801), A Planner's Odyssey (Projektantova odysea)

He was a co-author of the books
 1974 - Motherland's Chronicle (Kronika rodnej zeme)
 1975 - Homeland in Pictures (Rodná zem v obrazoch)
 1986 - Mirrors of the Slovak Rivers (V zrkadlách slovenských riek)

Death 
He died on February 22, 2007, aged 73.

External links
 Death of Jozef Dunajovec 

Slovak journalists
Writers from Bratislava
1933 births
2007 deaths
20th-century journalists